This is a list of genera in the plant family Ericaceae, which includes the heaths, heathers, epacrids, and blueberries.  As currently circumscribed, the family contains about 4000 species into more than 120 genera classified into 9 subfamilies.

Current understanding
The list shown here follows the phylogenetic classification of Kron et al. (2002), with modifications as per Stevens et al. (2004), Quinn et al. (2005), Albrecht et al. (2010), Gillespie & Kron (2010), and Craven (2011).

Nonetheless, much of the taxonomy within the Vaccinioideae is in flux. Multiple studies of the Gaultherieae have now shown Pernettya, Diplycosia (already including Pernettyopsis), and Tepuia to be nested within Gaultheria, although publication formalizing the transfers are yet to be published. Similarly, most of Vaccinieae has not been investigated using molecular techniques, and many genera are likely paraphyletic or polyphyletic. Neotropical and Old World Vaccinioideae are particularly poorly known.

Relevant recent synonymy include  Bruckenthalia with Erica, Leiophyllum and Loiseleuria  with Kalmia, and Diplarche and Menziesia with Rhododendron.

Genera

Notes

References

External links 
 List of Ericaceae Genera at the Missouri Botanical Garden
 List of Ericaceae Genera at The Plant List

 List
Ericaceae
Ericaceae
.List, Genera